William B. Sappington House, also known as Prairie Park, is a historic home located near Arrow Rock, Saline County, Missouri. It was built in 1843, and is a -story, square, Greek Revival style brick dwelling on a limestone foundation. It measures 60 feet wide. The front facade features a two-story front portico with Doric order and Ionic order columns.  Its roof is topped by a roof deck and cupola. The house was extensively restored from 1948 to 1955.

It was added to the National Register of Historic Places in 1970.

References

Houses on the National Register of Historic Places in Missouri
Greek Revival houses in Missouri
Houses completed in 1843
Buildings and structures in Saline County, Missouri
National Register of Historic Places in Saline County, Missouri